The Promise is a 1969 British drama film based on a play by Russian playwright Aleksei Arbuzov. Set in the Soviet Union during the Second World War, it is the story of a love triangle involving three young people caught up in the Siege of Leningrad. The film follows the main protagonists in the post-war years in an attempt to show the lasting effects of that relationship. It featured Ian McKellen's film debut.

The film was on the British Film Institute's BFI 75 Most Wanted list of lost films until a mislabeled copy was found in the British Film Institute's archive after an audit.

Cast
John Castle as Marat Yestigneyev
Ian McKellen as Leonidik
Susan Macready as Lika Vasilyevna
Mary Jones as Mother
David Nettheim as Stepfather
David Garfield as Soldier

See also
List of lost films

References

External links 
 BFI 75 Most Wanted entry, with extensive notes
 

1969 romantic drama films
British romantic drama films
British films based on plays
Films set in the Soviet Union
British World War II films
1960s rediscovered films
Rediscovered British films
1960s English-language films
1960s British films